Getatchew Mekurya (Amharic: ጌታቸው መኩሪያ ወልደ ተክሌ; 14 March 1935 – 4 April 2016) was an Ethiopian jazz saxophonist.

Early career
Mekurya was born on 14 March 1935, in Yifat, Ethiopia. His father was a honey merchant. Young Getatchew played traditionel Ethiopian instruments such as the washint flute, the krar and the masenqo, and later moved on to the saxophone and clarinet. 
 
At age 13, he began his professional career in 1949 as a part of the Municipality Band in Addis Ababa. In 1955 he joined the house band at Addis' Haile Selassie I Theatre, and in 1965 joined the famous Police Orchestra.

He was also one of the first musicians to record an instrumental version of shellela, a genre of traditional Amhara vocal music sung by warriors before going into battle. Mekurya took the shellela tradition seriously, often appearing onstage in a warrior's animal-skin tunic and lion's mane headdress. He continued to refine his instrumental shellela style, recording an entire album in 1970, Negus of Ethiopian Sax, released on Philips Ethiopia during the heyday of the Ethiojazz movement. Mekurya continued to work alongside many of the biggest orchestras in the Ethiopian capital, accompanying renowned singers Alemayehu Eshete, Hirut Beqele, and Ayalew Mesfin.

Later career, collaborations with The Ex and others
Mekurya reached an international audience when his album Negus of Ethiopian Sax was re-released as part of the Ethiopiques CD series. Mekurya's playing style has been compared to free jazz, but developed in isolation from it during the early 1950s. Mekurya has said he is unfamiliar with either Ornette Coleman or Albert Ayler.

Dutch avant-garde/punk band The Ex caught the ears of Mekurya, and he invited them to play with him, which they did from 2004 on. Mekurya asked the Ex to be the backing band for his 2006 album, Moa Anbessa. The Ex and Mekurya toured The Netherlands, Belgium and France together in 2006 and 2007, and then the United States in 2008 and Canada in 2009 with members of the group Fendika. A second album with The Ex, Y'Anbessaw Tezeta, was released in 2012.

Mèkurya added his distinctive sound to collaborations with numerous other contemporary artists, including British Tamil singer Susheela Raman and Boston jazz ensemble Either/Orchestra. He lived in Addis Ababa, and regularly performed at the Sunset Bar at the Sheraton Addis, and also at Fendika Azmari Bet.

Personal life
Mekurya's wife Ayalech died in 2015. He died in 2016 of a leg infection caused by diabetes, aged 81. He was survived by nine children and numerous grandchildren.

Discography
 "Shellela" 45 (late 1950s)
 Ethiopiques Volume 14: Negus of Ethiopian Sax (recorded in 1970, originally released on Philips Ethiopia in 1972)
 Ethiopiques Volume 20: Either/Orchestra Live in Addis (Mekuria appears on the track "Shellella") (recorded in 2004)
 Moa Anbessa (with The Ex and other guests) (2006)
 Gétatchèw Mèkurya & The Ex + Guests [DVD, Ethiosonic/Buda Musique] (2007)
 Y'Anbessaw Tezeta (with the Ex and Friends, 2012)
 The Rough Guide to the Music of Ethiopia (2012, World Music Network)

References

External links

 
 Getatchew Mekurya at discogs.com
 Obituary at The New York Times

1935 births
2016 deaths
20th-century saxophonists
Ethiopian musicians
21st-century saxophonists